James Edward Purdy (December 19, 1858 – August 2, 1933) was an American photographer based in Boston, Massachusetts.

Biography
Born in Saco, Maine, Purdy began his professional photography career in Wakefield, Massachusetts. In 1896, he opened his studio at 146 Tremont Street, Boston, with a partner named C. H. Howard. They decided that the business should focus on sales of celebrity photographs to newspapers and magazines, and in accordance, they specialized in making prints, working with silver bromide, carbon, and platinum papers to vary the tone. In addition, the studio, J. E. Purdy and Co., was the leading photograph provider for Boston-area high schools for much of the 20th century.

Purdy was described by one cultural critic as one of the major "legitimate" photographers in the United States, "The famous Boston photographic artist, who has undoubtedly taken more portraits of really distinguished statesmen, authors, educators, artists, clergymen, diplomats, journalists and persons eminent in various professions than any photographer in New England."

Purdy's son, Stanley Blanchard Purdy (d. 1966) joined the business in 1908 and eventually took over the studio after his father's death in 1933.

Gallery

References

External links

1858 births
1933 deaths
Artists from Boston
19th-century American photographers
People from Saco, Maine
20th-century American photographers
American Freemasons